Robert John Maurer (born January 7, 1967) is a retired Major League Baseball (MLB) first baseman,

Maurer attended Mater Dei High School in Evansville, Indiana and the University of Evansville, where he played for the Evansville Purple Aces baseball team.

Maurer was drafted by the Texas Rangers in the 6th round of the 1988 Major League Baseball Draft. He appeared in 21 games for the Rangers Wearing #39 during the 1991 and 1992 MLB seasons and retired from professional baseball after the 1994 season.

External links

 Baseball Almanac

1967 births
Living people
Sportspeople from Evansville, Indiana
Baseball players from Indiana
Evansville Purple Aces baseball players
Butte Copper Kings players
Charlotte Rangers players
Tulsa Drillers players
Oklahoma City 89ers players
Texas Rangers players
Major League Baseball first basemen